YKI (Finnish: Yleinen Kielitutkinto Swedish: Allmän språkexamen  English: National Certificate of Language Proficiency) is a  certification in the Finnish language, Swedish language and Saami language issued by the University of Jyväskylä and sanctioned by the Finnish Ministry of Education, following a standardized exam comprising oral and written parts that match the Common European Framework of Reference for Languages (CEFR) requirements and proficiency levels.

The YKI certification divides linguistic proficiency into three broad levels: upper, middle, and lower. These can be further divided into six levels that match the CEFR classification system.

Foreigners must pass the middle level certification in Finnish or Swedish (levels 3 or 4) to qualify for Finnish citizenship.

References

Finnish language tests